XHTJ-FM is a radio station on 94.7 FM in Gómez Palacio, Durango, Mexico. The station carries a Christian format known as La Voz.

History
XHTJ began as XETJ-AM 570. It was owned by Alejandro O. Stevenson with a concession dated April 16, 1953, but it had begun operations in 1949. It was known as Radio Alegría and carried primarily norteña and tropical music.

XETJ migrated in 2011 to FM on 94.7 MHz.

References

Radio stations in Durango
Radio stations in the Comarca Lagunera
Mexican radio stations with expired concessions